The  Office of Civil and Defense Mobilization, created in 1958 originally as Office of Defense and Civilian Mobilization, was an office of the Executive Office of the President of the United States which consolidated the functions of the existing Office of Defense Mobilization and the Federal Civil Defense Administration. The civil defense functions of the office were transferred to the Department of Defense's Office of Civil Defense from August 1, 1961. With its remaining functions, the office was re-designated as the Office of Emergency Planning from September 22, 1961. It eventually was renamed the Office of Emergency Preparedness from October 21, 1968, and abolished on July 1, 1973.

Directors
Leo Hoegh, July 1, 1958 – January 20, 1961
John S. Patterson, January 20, 1961 – January 27, 1961 
Lewis Berry, January 27, 1961 – March 9, 1961 
Frank Ellis, March 9, 1961 – February 2, 1962 (Emergency Planning from September 22, 1961)
Edward McDermott, February 2, 1962 – March 4, 1965 
Buford Ellington, March 4, 1965 – March 23, 1966
Farris Bryant, March 23, 1966 – October 9, 1967
Price Daniel, October 9, 1967 – January 20, 1969 (Emergency Preparedness from October 21, 1968)
George Lincoln, January 29, 1969 – January 20, 1973
Darrell Trent, January 20, 1973 – July 1, 1973

See also
 Federal Emergency Management Agency
 United States civil defense

References

Executive Office of the President of the United States
Defunct agencies of the United States government
Government agencies established in 1958
1958 establishments in the United States